The E.P.s of R.P. is a compilation of the anarcho-punk band Rudimentary Peni, released on LP in 1987 on Corpus Christi Records. It contains both of the band's first two 7" EPs, Rudimentary Peni and Farce. In 1994, it was reissued on CD on the band's own Outer Himalayan Records.

Tracks 1-12 were taken from the Rudimentary Peni 7" EP, recorded at Street Level in 1981 and released in August that year. Tracks 13-22 were from the Farce 7" EP, recorded at Southern Studios, London, in 1982, engineered by John Loder, produced by Penny Rimbaud and Rudimentary Peni, and released on Crass Records in July of that year.

Critical reception
AllMusic wrote that "these releases were throttling and brash, shamelessly self-explanatory, and fond of intense speed shifts as they tottered over a pre-grindcore method of handling near chaos." Trouser Press thought that the record contains "some mini-masterworks of alienated vitriol."

Track listing 

 "Media Person"
 "Him Hymn"
 "Blind Dogs"
 "B-Ward"
 "Crazy Chain"
 "The Gardener"
 "Teenage Time Killer"
 "Hearse"
 "Dead Living"
 "Black President"
 "Tower of Strength"
 "Play"
 "Sacrifice"
 "Cosmetic Plague"
 "Subdued Violence"
 "Only Human"
 "The Bile Ball"
 "Farce"
 "Bloody Jellies"
 "Mice Race"
 "Defined By Age"
 "Zero Again"
 "Bubble"

Personnel 
Jon Greville - drums
Grant Matthews - bass
Nick Blinko - vocals, guitar and art

References

Rudimentary Peni albums
1987 compilation albums